The Shena Simon Campus, formerly the Shena Simon Sixth Form College, is an educational facility on Whitworth Street, Manchester, England. It is a Grade II listed building.

History
The building was designed by Potts Son and Hennings and was officially opened by the Duke of Devonshire as the Central Higher Grade School in 1901. During the First World War, the building was requisitioned by the War Office to create the 2nd Western General Hospital, a facility for the Royal Army Medical Corps to treat military casualties. It became the Central High School in 1920, the Central High School for Girls in 1960 and then the Shena Simon Sixth Form College (named after Shena Simon, the politician and feminist) in 1982. It was absorbed into City College Manchester in 2001 and became a campus of The Manchester College in 2008.

Alumni

Central High School for Girls
 Carol Birch, novelist
 Vivian Tierney, operatic soprano, married to Alan Woodrow
 Arlene Phillips CBE, choreographer, known for Strictly Come Dancing

See also
Manchester Central High School for Boys

References

Education in Manchester